The Archbishop of Vienna is the prelate of the Roman Catholic Archdiocese of Vienna who is concurrently the metropolitan bishop of its ecclesiastical province which includes the dioceses of Eisenstadt, Linz and St. Pölten.

From 1469 to 1513, bishops from elsewhere were appointed as administrators. The first bishop residing in Vienna was Georg von Slatkonia. From 1861 to 1918, the archbishops, as members of the Herrenhaus, were represented in the Reichsrat of Cisleithania and bore the title of a Prince-Archbishop.

References

 
Vienna
Austria religion-related lists
Catholic Church in Austria